= North Santiam County Park =

State park in Oregon, United States

- Location within Oregon Location within the United States
- Type: Public, state
- Location: Marion and Linn counties, Oregon
- Nearest city: Salem
- Coordinates: 44°46′16″N 122°33′54″W
- Operator: Marion County

North Santiam County Park (formerly North Santiam State Recreation Area) is a park located in the U.S. state of Oregon, situated along the North Santiam River.

In 2023, the Oregon Parks and Recreation Commission formally approved transferring the North Santiam property to Marion County.
